Hamdan bin Zayed bin Sultan Al Nahyan (born in 19 February 1963) is an Emirati politician and royal. He is the ruler's representative in the western region of Abu Dhabi. Sheikh Hamdan is a son of the late Zayed bin Sultan Al Nahyan, President of the United Arab Emirates and Emir of Abu Dhabi. Hamdan is the younger brother of both former UAE president Khalifa bin Zayed and the current president, Mohamed bin Zayed.

Early life and education
Sheikh Hamdan was born in Al Ain in 1963. He is the 4th son of the founder of United Arab Emirates, the late president Sheikh Zayed bin Sultan Al Nahyan, who also served as the emir of Abu Dhabi. His mother is Sheikha Fatima bint Mubarak Al Ketbi and he has five full-brothers: Mohamed, Hazza, Tahnoun, Mansour, and Abdullah. They are known as Bani Fatima or sons of Fatima. In addition, he is the younger paternal half-brother  of the former emir and UAE president Khalifa bin Zayed Al Nahyan.

He has a bachelor's degree in political sciences and business administration, both from the United Arab Emirates University.

Career
Along with his half-brother Sheikh Sultan bin Zayed Al Nahyan, they served as Deputy Prime Minister of the United Arab Emirates in the cabinet led by the prime minister Mohammed bin Rashid Al Maktoum, who is the emir of Dubai. He serves as Chairman of state-owned gas company Dolphin Energy.

Sports
He was the Chairman of the UAE Football Association (1984–1993). In 2019, he opened the new ERC headquarters at Zayed Sports City in Abu Dhabi.

Banning of child camel jockeys
During 2002, he announced the ban of employing children as camel jockeys.

Post
 United Arab Emirates
Cabinet of UAE (1990–2009)
Chairman of the Emirati German Friendship Society
Chairman of the Red Crescent Authority
Chairman of the Emirates Camel Racing Federation
ex-President of UAE Football League
 Abu Dhabi
President of Abu Dhabi University Board of Trustees
Ruler's Representative in the Western Region (since 2009)
The Honorary Chairmanship of Al-Jazira Club and Chairman of the Honorary Panel.

Personal life
Sheikh Hamdan was married to Sheikha Ayesha bint Suhail Al Ketbi (divorced later) with whom he has two sons:
Sheikh Sultan bin Hamdan Al Nahyan.
Sheikh Mohammed bin Hamdan Al Nahyan.

Hamdan bin Zayed married Sheikha Shamsa bint Hamdan bin Mohammed Al Nahyan in 1988. They have seven children:
Sheikha Fatima bint Hamdan Al Nahyan. 
Sheikh Zayed bin Hamdan Al Nahyan (born on 4 April, 1990).
Sheikha Latifa bint Hamdan Al Nahyan.
Sheikha Salama bint Hamdan Al Nahyan.
Sheikh Hazza bin Hamdan Al Nahyan.
Sheikh Yas bin Hamdan Al Nahyan (born 1998)
Sheikh Rashid bin Hamdan Al Nahyan (born 2006).

His father-in-law, Sheikh Hamdan bin Mohammed Al Nahyan, was a distant cousin of the founder of UAE, Sheikh Zayed bin Sultan Al Nahyan.

Honours 
 First Class Medal of the Order of Abu Bakar Siddiq of the International Red Cross and Red Crescent Movement (2001).
 Gold Medal of the Iraqi Red Crescent Society (2003).
 Hilal-e-Pakistan (March 2008).
 Germany – Grand Cross of the Order of Merit of the Federal Republic of Germany (14 December 2008).

Ancestry

References

1963 births
Living people
Emirati politicians
Deputy Prime Ministers of the United Arab Emirates
Government ministers of the United Arab Emirates
Hamdan
People from Abu Dhabi
Children of presidents of the United Arab Emirates
Sons of monarchs